Southern Scientific Center of the Russian Academy of Science (SSC RAS) is a regional unit of the Russian Academy of Science, which includes research groups from a number of cities located in the Southern Federal District of Russia. SSC RAS was established on December 19, 2002. 

SSC RAS focuses on the following areas in research:
Molecular Biology
Astrophysics
Multiprocessing Systems
Theory of Molecular Computers (DNA Computing)
Predicting and preventing natural disasters
Luminescent materials
Modernizing rail transport
Exploring marine ecosystems
Social, economic and humanitarian problems of the South of Russia.

External links 
 

Russian Academy of Sciences